Sign of the Times, A Sign of the Times, or Signs of the Times may refer to:

Christianity 
 Matthew 16:2b–3, a passage in the Gospel of Matthew which contains the phrase the signs of the times
 Signs of Christ's return
 Sign of the times (Catholicism), a phrase associated with some Aggiornamentos of the Roman Catholic Church
Signs of the Times Publishing Association, publishing house of the Seventh-day Adventist Church

Magazines
 Signs of the Times (magazine), Seventh-day Adventist monthly magazine for North America, published by Pacific Press
 Signs of the Times (Australian magazine), a Seventh-day Adventist monthly magazine, published by Signs Publishing Company
 Signs of the Times (Millerite magazine), published by followers of William Miller, and started in 1840

Music

Albums
 Sign o' the Times, a 1987 album by Prince
 Sign of the Times (Axel Rudi Pell album), 2020
 Sign of the Times (Bob James album), 1981
 Sign of the Times: The Best of Queensrÿche, a 2007 compilation album by Queensrÿche
 Sign of the Times (Cosmic Gate album), 2009
 Sign of the Times (Rubettes album), 1976
 A Sign of the Times (Joe Pass album), 1966
 A Sign of the Times/My Love, originally My Love, a 1966 album by Petula Clark
 A Sign of the Times: The Spark Recordings 1975–1976, compilation album by Tommy Hunt

Songs
 "Sign of the Times" (Petula Clark song), also known as "A Sign of the Times", a 1966 song
 "Sign of the Times" (Bryan Ferry song), 1978
 "Sign of the Times" (Slade song), 1979
 "Sign of the Times" (The Belle Stars song), 1983
 "Sign o' the Times" (song), a 1987 song by Prince
 "Sign of the Times" (Queensrÿche song), 1997
 "Sign of the Times" (CeeLo Green song), 2015
 "Sign of the Times" (Harry Styles song), 2017
 "Sign of the Times", a 1981 song by Madness from 7
 "Sign of the Times", a 1984 song by Quiet Riot from the album Condition Critical
 "Sign of the Times", a 1985 song by Grandmaster Flash from the album They Said It Couldn't Be Done
 "Sign of the Times", a 1986 song by Cro-Mags from The Age of Quarrel
 "Sign of the Times", a 2011 song by Three Days Grace from Transit of Venus

Other 
 Sign o' the Times (film), a 1987 concert film featuring Prince
 "Signs of the Times", an 1829 essay by Thomas Carlyle